USS LST-571 was a United States Navy  used in the Asiatic-Pacific Theater during World War II.

Construction and commissioning
LST-571 was laid down on 14 April 1944 at Evansville, Indiana, by the Missouri Valley Bridge and Iron Company. She was launched on 25 May 1944, sponsored by Mrs. Joseph H. Hayes, and commissioned on 14 June 1944.

Service history
During the war, LST-571 was assigned to the Pacific Theater of Operations. She took part in the Philippines campaign, participating in the Invasion of Lingayen Gulf in January 1945 and the Battle of Okinawa in April through June 1945.

Following the war, LST-571 performed occupation duty in the Far East until early December 1945. Upon her return to the United States, LST-571 was decommissioned on 12 March 1946 and struck from the Navy list on 12 April that same year. On 17 August 1948, the ship was sold to the Port Houston Iron Works, Inc., of Houston, Texas, for non-self-propelled operation.

Honors and awards
LST-571 earned two battle stars for her World War II service.

Notes
Citations

Bibliography
Online sources

External links

LST-542-class tank landing ships
World War II amphibious warfare vessels of the United States
Ships built in Evansville, Indiana
1944 ships